Free Negro Springs is a spring in Benton County in the U.S. state of Missouri.

A variant name was "Free Nigger Springs". The creek was named after two free people of color who lived along its course.

See also
List of rivers of Missouri

References

Bodies of water of Benton County, Missouri
Springs of Missouri